Kara Maria (née Kara Maria Sloat; born 1968) is an American visual artist working in painting and mixed media. Her work reflects on political topics – feminism, war, and the environment. She borrows from the broad vocabulary of contemporary painting; blending geometric shapes, vivid hues, and abstract marks, with representational elements. She is based in San Francisco, California.

Biography 
Kara Maria Sloat was born in 1968 in Binghamton, New York. Kara Maria moved to San Francisco in 1990 to attend the University of California, Berkeley (UC Berkeley). From UC Berkeley she earned a BA in Art Practice in 1993, followed by an MFA in 1998. She is married to artist Enrique Chagoya.

According to the Sacramento News & Review: "If scientists could record a visual representation of human emotions, it seems plausible that they would look like Kara Maria's paintings. The San Francisco artist's nonrepresentational geometric shapes are exuberantly hued, well-defined and sharp-edged, and they are interrupted by euphoric swirls or by vague, cloudy patches and an occasional flash of a representational item, like a dog or a fly. They're layered, complicated and electric—just like the workings of the mind. Until scientists figure out how to live stream what human emotions look like and project them on a wall, Maria's work may be the closest thing we've got."

Maria's work can be found in permanent collections including the Crocker Art Museum; the San Jose Museum of Art; Cantor Arts Center; the di Rosa preserve; the de Saisset Museum, among others. She has been the recipient of awards such as a Masterminds Grant from the SF Weekly; a grant from Artadia; and an Eisner Prize from the University of California, Berkeley. In 2014-15 Maria was an Artist in Residence at Recology (the San Francisco dump). She also completed a residency at Djerassi Artists Residency in 2003, and was a Lucas Fellow at the Montalvo Arts Center, Saratoga, CA for 2015 to 2016. Presses including Gallery 16; Shark's Ink, Lyons, Colorado; and Smith Andersen Editions, Palo Alto, California have published her prints.

References

External links 
 Artist's website

1968 births
Living people
American contemporary painters
Artists from the San Francisco Bay Area
American women painters
21st-century American women artists